Sir William Lynch (c. 1730 – 25 August 1785) was a British diplomat and politician who sat in the House of Commons between 1762 and 1780.

Lynch was the eldest son of John Lynch, DD Dean of Canterbury, and his wife Mary Wake, daughter of William Wake, Archbishop of Canterbury.

Lynch was elected Member of Parliament for Weobley at a by-election in 1762, and held the seat until 1768. He was then elected MP for Canterbury and held the seat until 1774. He was then returned again as MP for Weobley until he resigned in March 1780.

In September 1768 Lynch was appointed envoy extraordinary to the court of Turin and served from 1769 to 1776. He was appointed Knight of the Order of the Bath, and a privy counsellor.

In 1780, he inherited the Manor of Stalisfield, until his death.

Lynch lived at The Groves at Staple, Kent, where he made great improvements, adding two wings to the house and adding a new front of stucco. He built up a collection of pictures. He created parkland in the grounds and made extensive plantations.

Lynch died at Barèges in the south of France, where he went to drink the waters, and was interred at Staple in Kent.

Lynch married Mary Coke, daughter of Edward Coke of Canterbury, but had no issue.

References

1730s births
1785 deaths
British diplomats
Year of birth uncertain
Members of the Parliament of Great Britain for English constituencies
British MPs 1768–1774
People from Stalisfield Green